Avin may refer to:
 Avin, East Azerbaijan
 Avin-e Olya, Hormozgan Province
 Avin-e Sofla, Hormozgan Province
 Avin International, an oil and gas transportation company based in Greece